The Republic of Vietnam competed as Vietnam at the 1968 Summer Olympics in Mexico City, Mexico. Nine competitors, seven men and two women, took part in seven events in five sports.

Athletics

Cycling

Two cyclists represented Vietnam in 1968.

Individual road race
 Bùi Văn Hoàng
 Trương Kim Hùng

Fencing

One fencer represented Vietnam in 1968.

Men's sabre
 Nguyễn The Loc

Shooting

Three shooters, all male, represented Vietnam in 1968.

25 m pistol
 Vũ Văn Danh

50 m pistol
 Hồ Minh Thu
 Dương Văn Dan

Swimming

References

External links
Official Olympic Reports

Nations at the 1968 Summer Olympics
1968
1968 in Vietnam